Africaine is a collection of 1959 recordings by jazz artist Art Blakey and The Jazz Messengers. The collection was not released until over 20 years after it was recorded. The album features tenor-saxophonist Wayne Shorter in his first recording with The Jazz Messengers, trumpeter Lee Morgan, pianist Walter Davis, Jr. and bassist Jymie Merritt.

Reception

Michael G. Nastos of Allmusic called it, "a recording that shows a band fully able to fuse many exotically attractive elements into a unified whole of creative jazz music ecstasy".

Track listing 
"Africaine" (Shorter) – 7:57
"Lester Left Town" (Shorter) – 8:35
"Splendid" (Davis) – 7:46
"Haina" (Morgan) – 10:17
"The Midget" (Morgan) – 6:00
"Celine" (Morgan) – 4:50

Personnel
Art Blakey – drums
Lee Morgan – trumpet
Wayne Shorter – tenor saxophone
Walter Davis, Jr. – piano
Jymie Merritt – acoustic bass
Dizzy Reece – conga drums (on tracks 1 & 4)

References 

1981 albums
Blue Note Records albums
Art Blakey albums
The Jazz Messengers albums
Instrumental albums
Albums produced by Alfred Lion
Albums recorded at Van Gelder Studio